Dendy is a series of home video game consoles, an unofficial hardware clone of Nintendo's third-generation Famicom. Dendy was produced by Steepler since late 1992, and assembled in Taiwan from Chinese components. It was mainly sold in Russia and post-Soviet countries. Manufacturing assembly grew to add the Subor factory in China and at Tenzor factory in Dubna town in Russia.

The Dendy lineup was divided into two categories: the basic Dendy Classic and the budget Dendy Junior, which differ in design, quality, and price. The Classic is a copy of the Micro Genius console of Taiwan TXC Corporation and was produced in the same factory. The Junior was made from cheaper system on a chip technology specifically for Steepler. A Dendy Pro version with one wired and one wireless gamepad was sold from only one small batch.

Because the Famicom and Nintendo Entertainment System were never officially sold in post-Soviet states, the Dendy achieved great popularity in the region. It was promoted through television programs and video game magazines. Dendy became a household name in Russia and began to be applied to the rest of the Famicom hardware clones, colloquially called Famiclones, and to other consoles. After the bankruptcy of Steepler, sales of the original Dendy ceased in 1998, and at the time, according to various estimates, between 1.5 and 6 million units were sold. It is believed that it created a market for video games and game consoles in Russia.

History

Beginning 

In 1992, businessman Viktor Savyuk came to the Steepler company with a proposal to create and sell TV game consoles with removable game cartridges under the Dendy trademark. Before that, the company had been supplying Hewlett-Packard products, system integration, and localizing the Windows 3.x operating systems into Russian with the CyrWin package.  The company's founders planned to develop a gaming division, and in September 1992, Savyuk joined a newly established division.

Savyuk established contacts with Taiwanese console manufacturers and expressed interest in their products. Steepler did not consider selling the original Famicom, as it was three times more expensive than existing bootleg clones, and Nintendo was not interested in the CIS countries market. Eventually, Steepler made a deal with TXC Corporation, a Taiwanese firm that produced Famiclones and sold them under the Micro Genius brand.  The first console sold by Steepler under the Dendy brand was the Micro Genius IQ-501, which went on sale as the Dendy Classic. In creating the name, Savyuk chose the English word for Dandy - a man who emphasises physical appearance, refined language, and leisurely hobbies. The letter "a" was replaced by an "e" for easier reading in Russian.

The console's mascot, the elephant Dendy was drawn by Russian animator Ivan Maximov. The console was advertised on Russian television with the slogan "Dendy, Dendy, we all love Dendy! Dendy — everybody plays!". The "Neschastniy Sluchai" music band recorded the commercial, with the music written by keyboardist Sergey Chekryzhov, and the slogan was created by guitarist Andrey Guvakov. Animation for the clip was also made with the band. The commercial started running two weeks before the start of sales, and was broadcast by Video International.

Dendy went on sale on December 17, 1992, for 39,000 rubles (then equivalent to ). However, a mistake in introducing the device to the market made the first batch with the PAL-I video standard, whereas the SECAM-DK standard was required instead. The whole first batch was repaired in Moscow. The first brand shops were opened in Moscow on Petrovka, Krasnaya Presnya and in the passage leading from the Teatralnaya metro station to the GUM department store. By February 1993, sales were up to 3,000 consoles per month. Games were profitable, and Steepler managers traveled to the regions to find regional dealers and purchase advertising.

Demand became very high, and in April 1993, Steepler already had four regional dealers and a turnover of 500 million rubles ($722,000). By late 1993, up to 4,000 consoles were sold daily, and a study of consumer demand found that in the "consumer electronics" category, Dendy was in third place after the refrigerator and television set. The console had become a household name and began to be applied to the other Famiclones, and to different consoles. Steepler filled a virtually unoccupied niche, and the world's manufacturers of computer games and consoles were not interested in Russia at that time. It did not have to fight for demand because the main competitors were "gray" imports of similar products made in China. By the end of 1994, the company's annual turnover reached $75–80 million. Steepler eventually suspended the advertising campaign because demand exceeded supply.

Magazines and TV shows 
While exploring the print press market, Steepler came across the magazine Video-Ace Computer Games and suggested that the publisher should start a joint publication. The first issue of Video-Ace Dendy, edited by Valery Polyakov, came out in the summer of 1993. The first seven issues of the magazine were advertising brochures for Steepler products. Under an agreement with the French publisher Hachette Filipacchi-Press, the magazine also reprinted articles from the French magazines Joypad and Joystick. The magazine added articles on the Sega Mega Drive and Super Nintendo Entertainment System, which were also sold by Steepler.

After funding delays, the contract to publish the magazine was terminated, and Steepler launched its own magazine, Dendy: The New Reality, published by the Ptyuch magazine editorial staff, with the texts written by Steepler's advertising department. Six issues later, Dendy: The New Reality magazine closed down completely, and the editors of the closed Video-Ace Dendy magazine resumed publication under the name Velikiy Drakon, independently of Steepler.

Beginning in September 1994, the television program Dendy: The New Reality was launched on 2×2 TV channel by Steepler. The host was Sergei Suponev, who had previously hosted Time of Stars and Call of the Jungles. Each episode featured games for Dendy, Mega Drive, and Super NES. The show received high ratings and was very popular. After 33 episodes the program ended, and two months later it was resumed on the ORT channel as a second season with the abbreviated title The New Reality. The second season paid less attention to Dendy games, and in January 1996 the last episode aired. Reasons for the closure were cited as unfortunate airtime, 3:45 p.m. on Fridays, as not all children were home or watching TV at that time, and the production costs for each episode rose from $50,000 to $100,000. Shortly after The New Reality closed, MTK TV Channel launched a TV program called Dendy World, hosted by Semyon Furman and Sergei Gvozdev, which closed after 12 episodes.

Nintendo contract, competition, and downfall 
In 1994, 100,000-125,000 consoles were sold each month and the monthly turnover was $5 million. By 1995, the company hired singer Oleg Gazmanov and his son Rodion to continue advertising. In addition, the Argus animation studio was hired to produce a short animated film, The Adventures of Dendy the Elephant. A TV show consisting of thirteen episodes was also planned, but was never finished. Savyuk later said that the company discovered that user loyalty was over 80%, and that no advertising was needed at that rate.

Three new divisions were opened: Steepler Graphic Center for creating computer graphics, Steepler Trading for selling computer hardware, and a center for training programmers. Steepler soon reorganizes, which resulted in Steepler Trading's retail chain being spun off into a separate company, Lamport.

In 1994, Steepler wanted to gain support from Nintendo and tried to establish contact with its European division through its regional office in Germany. After a period of ignoring contacts, Nintendo learned about the popularity of 8-bit console clones in Russia, so they contacted Steepler in early 1994 and invited Viktor Savyuk to a meeting in Seattle with Nintendo of America executives Minoru Arakawa and Howard Lincoln. After many days of negotiations, Steepler reached an agreement with Nintendo, under which it gave up promotion of Sega products and received exclusive rights to distribute Super Nintendo Entertainment System and Game Boy consoles in Commonwealth of Independent States and all post-Soviet states. Under this agreement, Nintendo also relinquished its claim to Dendy sales.

At the end of 1994, Steepler had two competitors: Lamport, which began to produce its own Kenga console, and Bitman, which bought Famicom, Mega Drive, and Game Boy clones from Taiwan. Kenga distinguished itself by offering the Ken-Boy portable console, while Bitman signed a formal agreement with Sega under which it began selling licensed Mega Drive 2, Mega CD 2, Mega Drive 32X, Game Gear, Sega Saturn and the educational Sega Pico. Both companies closed their game businesses a year and a half later; Kenga repositioned itself as a children's goods store, and Bitman was bought out by the R-Style company.

In January 1995, sales dropped noticeably, and an investigation revealed that competitors had started buying consoles in China and were able to reduce prices below the cost of Dendy consoles. At the time, Dendy was still being manufactured in Taiwan. In addition Subor, a Chinese company, entered the market. Subor had previously approached Steepler with a proposal for cooperation, but was rejected. With the support of the Chinese government, Subor opened an office in Moscow and engaged in dumping. After that Subor proposed to Steepler to transfer the production to the Subor factory, making the wholesale price $8–9 as compared to the previous $12 at the Taiwanese factory. The terms were accepted, and an order was placed for 80,000 Dendy consoles at factories in China. In addition, Steepler gained the right to exclusively distribute the Subor SB-225 and SB-225B through its stores, and sales returned to previous levels. In November 1995, Dendy had 10 subsidiaries in the regions and 80 dealers, and retail prices for the consoles dropped to $20.

After the mid-1990s, the 16-bit Mega Drive and Super Nintendo consoles began to give way in the West to next-generation consoles, such as the first PlayStation. In Russia, the era of 8-bit consoles was also coming to an end. Steepler planned to start selling various consumer electronics, such as DVD players, under the Dendy brand. However, those plans fell through when Steepler won a tender to automate the State Duma. Due to opposition from the Federal Agency of Government Communications and Information and assassination attempts on employees, Steepler lost contracts with government agencies and went bankrupt in 1996. The Dendy division survived as a separate company, even though working capital was held in Steepler accounts, and faced great difficulties. For a time, suppliers sold goods to the company on credit, but when that ran out, the Dendy division was forced to sell stock exclusively for months. Eventually, when the 1998 Russian financial crisis hit, the company closed completely.

Some estimates of Dendy sales in Russia are between 1.5 and 2 million consoles, and other estimates range up to 6 million. The console gained nostalgic status among those who were children in Russia in the 1990s, similar to the Nintendo and Sega consoles of the same era in the United States, Japan, and Europe. At the time, the name Dendy became synonymous with game consoles that plugged into a television set, and it is believed that it was Dendy that created the video game and game console market in Russia, and that it gave rise to the first generation of Russian gamers. Its popularity led to the appearance of counterfeit Dendy clones from other manufacturers. As of 2021, Dendy are collectors' items, and popular among retrogaming fans in Russia.

Models 

Dendy was produced in several modifications. In general, the lineup was divided into two categories: the basic Classic and the budget Junior. The first console of the series is a copy of the Taiwanese Micro Genius IQ-501, which was based on the Twin Famicom from Sharp. Taiwan's TXC Corporation reimagined the Twin Famicom design and made the console more compact. Steepler rebranded the IQ-501 as the Dendy Classic and released it on December 17, 1992.

In mid 1993, the Dendy Junior was released, which became "a simplified version of Classic for younger children". The company decided that it was necessary to create a console so cheap that it would be more profitable for wholesalers to buy it from Steepler than from Chinese suppliers. The Dendy Junior was created using cheaper technology and used a system on a chip. The console was originally designed by TXC Corporation on request specifically for Steepler, to compete with the suppliers of Chinese clones, which were of low quality and sold cheaper. The design of the console was copied from the original Famicom, and the box design was done by Rustem Adagamov. The Dendy Junior had a wholesale price of $29, and after its release Classic sales went up.

The next model was the Dendy Junior II, which had a rounded case similar to the Dendy Junior, but the gamepads were non-detachable and the second of them lacked the Start and Select buttons. It was accompanied by the Dendy Junior IIP, which featured a light gun, similar in appearance to the NES Zapper, and a multi-game cartridge.

After the Junior II, the Dendy Junior IVP was released, which missed out on the Junior III name because unknown competitors had released a modified Junior II model under that name. Steepler decided not to compete with them and immediately released the Junior IVP in black, made of cheaper plastic and with a light gun similar to the Beretta M9 included.

The final model in the series was the Dendy Classic II, based on the Micro Genius IQ-502, with a new rounded design and new gamepads. The console was more expensive than the regular Junior versions and was in low demand. There were also plans to release Dendy Pro, based on the Micro Genius IQ-1000, which featured one wired and one wireless gamepad. Savyuk described it to Kommersant newspaper as a console that would "compete with the best Japanese 8-bit consoles", but in the end, he said it only went on sale in a limited batch of 1,000-1,200 units, which sold poorly.

Game cartridges 

As a Famiclone, Dendy runs Famicom games. A large number of counterfeit copies of NES games, homemade hacked versions of games, and so-called "multi-game" cartridges, such as "99 in 1", were released for the Dendy. However, often, most of the games in the multi-game cartridges do not work, and the rest were essentially copies minor variations. The first versions of the Dendy cartridges were sold in cases labeled "TV. GAME CARTRIDGE" and with a dust cover. The most popular is the "Cartridge with gulls", with "9999 Games to 1", a menu with gulls flying over the sea, and an 8-bit arrangement of the "Unchained Melody" by The Righteous Brothers.

The Dendy game library is a mix of legitimate games from American, Japanese, and European regions, and unofficial games by Chinese developers. Dendy's cartridges do not have memory for saving, so the games which used it, such as Final Fantasy, The Legend of Zelda and Metroid, never reached the Russian market. Steepler's Dendy cartridges yielded a collector market, with prices for game cartridges reaching tens of thousands of rubles as of 2021.

Many counterfeit Dendy games were often created by combining elements from other games and were named after a famous game series, although they actually had nothing to do with it. Such games included Street Fighter V (made long before the real Street Fighter V), Contra 6, and Robocop IV. Many Chinese developers copied games from other consoles for the Dendy and other Famiclones, such as Street Fighter II, Mortal Kombat, and various variants of Disney Interactive games. One of the most famous counterfeit Dendy games is Somari, based on Sonic the Hedgehog for Sega Mega Drive and developed in Taiwan. However, the game has been slowed down compared to the original, interspersed with elements from Sonic the Hedgehog 2, and the protagonist instead of Sonic is Mario wearing Tails's boots.

When copying official games, counterfeiters often changed their code and removed the logos of the game companies, which often triggers copy protection that makes the game completely unplayable or much more difficult. The most famous examples are Bucky O'Hare for its extremely high difficulty, and Teenage Mutant Ninja Turtles III: The Manhattan Project, where the final boss Shredder became immortal and impossible to beat.

See also 

 Famiclones
 Pegasus

References

Further reading

External links

Unlicensed Nintendo Entertainment System hardware clones
Products introduced in 1992
Video gaming in Russia